Blake Ball (February 25, 1938 – January 20, 2006) was an ice hockey defenceman who played thirteen years of minor league hockey. Ball spent the majority of his career in the Eastern Hockey League.

Playing career

Football
Ball spent six years in the Canadian Football League as a defensive end.

Hockey
Ball was nicknamed "Badman" because of the time spent in the penalty box as a member of the New Haven Blades (1964-1969). He had four consecutive seasons of at least 300 penalty minutes, including a career high 362 PIMs in 1968-69. During the 1968-69 season, Ball also recorded a career high in assists (42) and points (55).

Ball played the 1970 season with the Long Island Ducks. He played the 1971 season with the Johnstown Jets. On 13 September 1971 he was named player-coach for the Jacksonville Rockets. Despite his holding a position as player-coach, Ball and goaltender Ted Ouimet were dealt to the Syracuse Blazers on December 15, 1971.

Ball was suspended for two games, effective March 13, 1973, after a brawl in a Blazers-Rhode Island Eagles game.

Acting career
Ball had a minor role in the movie Slap Shot. He played defenceman Gilmore Tuttle, who was from Mile 40, Saskatchewan, and was running a donut shop after his retirement from hockey. According to public address announcer Jim Carr, Tuttle was the "former penalty-minute record holder for the years 1960 to 1968 inclusive" and wore uniform number 15.

Personal
Prior to becoming a professional hockey player, Ball had served as a police officer in Toronto. Ball had also worked as a masked professional wrestler in the Toronto area. "I wasn't supposed to do it," said Ball, "but like those (teammates) who wrestled in Macon, I wore a mask, so no one could tell who I was." Ball also admitted that he wrestled under different aliases.

After his retirement from hockey, Ball worked for a construction company in Grand Junction, Colorado operating heavy equipment such as bulldozers.

Death
Ball died January 20, 2006, in Kitchener from natural causes, brought on from dementia and Alzheimer. He was 67 years old. He predeceased his parents, Jessie and Blake Ball, who also died that year. He is survived by his children..

References

External links

1938 births
2006 deaths
Canadian ice hockey defencemen
Cleveland Crusaders players
Columbus Owls players
Ice hockey people from Ontario
Jacksonville Rockets players
Johnstown Jets players
New Haven Blades players
Macon Whoopees (SHL) players
Oklahoma City Blazers (1965–1977) players
People from St. Thomas, Ontario
Syracuse Blazers players
Syracuse Eagles players
Long Island Ducks (ice hockey) players
Canadian expatriate ice hockey players in the United States